The Kingdom of Mrauk-U (Arakanese: မြောက်ဦး နေပြည်တော်,) was a kingdom that existed on the Arakan littoral from 1429 to 1785. Based out of the capital Mrauk-U, near the eastern coast of the Bay of Bengal, the kingdom ruled over what is now Rakhine State, Myanmar and parts of Chittagong Division, Bangladesh. Though started out as a protectorate of the Bengal Sultanate from 1429 to 1531, Mrauk-U went on to conquer Chittagong with the help of the Portuguese. It twice fended off the Toungoo Burma's attempts to conquer the kingdom in 1546–1547, and 1580–1581. At its height of power, it briefly controlled the Bay of Bengal coastline from the Sundarbans to the Gulf of Martaban from 1599 to 1603. In 1666, it lost control of Chittagong after a war with the Mughal Empire. Its reign continued until 1785, when it was conquered by the Konbaung dynasty of Burma.

It was home to a multiethnic population with the city of Mrauk U being home to mosques, temples, shrines, seminaries and libraries. The kingdom was also a center of piracy and the slave trade. It was frequented by Arab, Danish, Dutch and Portuguese traders.

History

Launggyet Dynasty
Although Arakan kings paid tribute to the Pagan dynasty, the South was mostly free of Pagan suzerainty and largely cut off from the rest of Burma. Separated from Pagan by the Arakan Mountains, Arakan developed more independently to other Burmese regions. its capital moved from Thaibeiktaung to Dhanyawadi to Vesali before the 11th century, and then to Pyinsa, Parein, and Hkrit in the 12th century, with the capital moving to Pyinsa again in 1180, and then Launggyet in 1237.

Vassal state of Bengal Sultanate

Background 
Arakan had close contact with Bengal, coming into full contact with it as it was expanding eastwards. Bengal captured Satgaon and later Sonargaon towards the beginning of the 14th century, and during the reign of King Min Hti of Arakan (1279–1374), Bengal invaded Arakan by sea, raiding the Hinya river at Chittagong. Following the collapse of Pagan power and the death of Min Hti, Arakan fell into an interregnum, and constant raids were conducted by both the Burmese and the Talaing. The new king who took power in 1404, Narameikhla, who was a great-grandson of Min Hti, was immediately ousted by the forces of the Burmese Crown Prince Minye Kyawswa, who captured Launggyet and forced Narameikhla to flee to the court of the Sultanate of Bengal at Gour. During Narameikhla's 24-year exile, Arakan became an extensive battleground for the Ava Kingdom and the Pegu Kingdom. The King of Ava installed his son-in-law on the throne of Arakan, bestowing him the title of Anoarahtâ. Pegu forces later captured and executed him. The power struggle ended with Razadarit coming out on top, capturing Taunggyet and installing his own governor, who was in power until 1423.

Reign of Narameikhla
Following the death of Ahmed Shah in 1426, his son Nazir Shah took the throne of Bengal. After 24 years of exile, Narameikhla finally regained control of the Arakanese throne in 1430 with military assistance from Bengali commanders Wali Khan and Sindhi Khan. The Bengalis who came with him formed their own settlements in the region. Narameikhla ceded some territory to the Sultan of Bengal and recognised his sovereignty over the areas. In recognition of his kingdom's vassal status, the kings of Arakan received Islamic titles, despite being Buddhists, and legalised the use of Islamic gold dinar coins from Bengal within the kingdom. The kings compared themselves to Sultans and fashioned themselves after Mughal rulers. They also employed Muslims in prestigious positions within the royal administration. Narameikhla minted his own, with Burmese characters on one side and Persian characters on the other. Despite ruling parts of Bengal, it continued to remain a protectorate of the Sultan of Bengal up until 1531.

Narameikhla founded the city of Mrauk U, which was declared the capital of the Arakanese kingdom in 1431. As the city grew, many Buddhist pagodas and temples were built. Several of them remain, and these are the main attraction of Mrauk-U. From the 15th to the 18th centuries, Mrauk U was the capital of the Arakan kingdom, frequently visited by foreign traders (including Portuguese and Dutch). The golden city of Mrauk U became known in Europe as a city of oriental splendor after Friar Sebastian Manrique visited the area in the early 17th century. Father Manrique's vivid account of the coronation of King Thiri Thudhamma in 1635 and about the Rakhine Court and intrigues of the Portuguese adventurers fire the imagination of later authors. The English author Maurice Collis who made Mrauk U and Rakhine famous after his book The Land of the Great Image: Being experiences of Friar Manrique in Arakan based its accounts on Friar Manrique' travels in Arakan.

Independence from Bengal

Narameikhla was succeeded by his brother, Min Khayi Ali Khan (reigning 1434–59), who annexed Sandoway and Ramu in 1437. Ali Khan's successor, Ba Saw Phyu (Kalima Shah, named after his coins bearing the Kalima, reigning 1459–82) occupied Chittagong with the help of the Portuguese, at the beginning of his reign. Although Barbek Shah, the new Sultan of Bengal, allowed Bengal to falter, Arakan remained subordinate to Bengal until 1531. Ba Saw Phyu was succeeded by his son Dawlya, who launched a rebellion against him in 1482, taking his life. A line of weak kings followed. However, in 1531, Minbin took the throne, strengthening the fortifications of Mrauk U and fighting back against coastal raids by pirates. Minbin was responsible for the construction of the Shwedaung pagoda as well as the Shitthaung, Dukkanthein, and Lemyethna temples in Mrauk U.

During Minbin's reign, Arakan came under attack both from the north, from the coast, and from the east. In 1544, the armies of King Tabinshwehti of Burma invaded and took Sandoway, beginning the Toungoo–Mrauk-U War. However, he was unable to march further, and was held there for two years. Thus, he brought in Talaing and Shan fighters and revitalized his offensive, marching north to Mrauk U. However, once he reached the city, Tabinshwehti retreated, as he realised it was too well-defended and he did not want to besiege or blockade it. From the north came the Raja of Twipra, who marched as far as Ramu. However, he was driven back, and upon the Arakanese reclamation of Chittagong, Minbin struck from producing coins with his name that styled him as sultan. Minbin's reign ended in 1553.

Portuguese interference
Down the line of kings came Min Razagyi (1593–1612). In 1597, he joined the First Toungoo Empire in its siege of Pegu and requested the aid of Portuguese captain Felipe de Brito to assist him in it. Land levies and ships from Chittagong, and the city fell in 1599. de Brito was appointed governor of Syriam by Minyazagyi. However, he shook off Arakanese power over the region, and, supported by Goa, he pushed away the many attacks of Arakan. Minyazagyi took three years (1602–1605) to take Sandwip from Manuel de Mattos and Domingo Carvalho.

From 1531 to 1629, Arakanese raiders and Portuguese pirates operated from havens along the coast of the kingdom and brought slaves in from Bengal to the kingdom. Following many raids into Bengal, the slave population increased in the 17th century as they were employed in a variety of industries in Arakan.  Slaves included members of the Mughal nobility. A notable royal slave was Alaol, a renowned poet in the Arakanese court. Some of them worked as Arabic, Bengali, and Persian scribes in the Arakanese courts, which, despite remaining mostly Buddhist, adopted Islamic fashions from the neighbouring Sultanate of Bengal.

Mughal period 
Arakan lost control of end of eastern bank of the Kaladan river in southeast Bengal after the Mughal conquest of Chittagong. In 1660, Prince Shah Shuja, the governor of Mughal Bengal and a claimant of the Peacock Throne, fled to Arakan with his family after being defeated by his brother Emperor Aurangzeb during the Battle of Khajwa. Shuja and his entourage arrived in Arakan on 26 August 1660. He was granted asylum by King Sanda Thudhamma. In December 1660, the Arakanese king confiscated Shuja's gold and jewelry, leading to an insurrection by the royal Mughal refugees. According to varying accounts, Shuja's family was killed by the Arakanese, while Shuja himself may have fled to a kingdom in Manipur. However, members of Shuja's entourage remained in Arakan and were recruited by the royal army, including as archers and court guards. They were king makers in Arakan until the Burmese conquest. The Portuguese and Arakanese continued their raids of Mughal Bengal which includes a raid in Dhaka in 1625.

The Mahamuni Buddha image, which is now in Mandalay, was cast and venerated some 15 miles from Mrauk U where another Mahamuni Buddha Image flanked by two other Buddha images. Mrauk U can be easily reached via Sittwe, the capital of Rakhine State. From Yangon there are daily flights to Sittwe and there are small private boats as well as larger public boats plying through the Kaladan river to Mrauk U. It is only 45 miles from Sittwe and the seacoast. To the east of the old city is the famous Kispanadi stream and far away the Lemro river. The city area used to have a network of canals. Mrauk U maintains a small archaeological Museum near Palace site, which is right in the centre of town. As a prominent capital Mrauk U was carefully built in a strategic location by levelling three small hills. The pagodas are strategically located on hilltops and serve as fortresses; indeed they are once used as such in times of enemy intrusion. There are moats, artificial lakes and canals and the whole area could be flooded to deter or repulse attackers. There are innumerable pagodas and Buddha images all over the old city and the surrounding hills. Some are still being used as places of worship today many in ruins, some of which are now being restored to their original splendor.

Burmese conquest
Following Konbaung Dynasty's conquest of Arakan in 1785, as many as 35,000 people of the Rakhine State fled to the neighbouring Chittagong region of British Bengal in 1799 to escape persecution by the Bamar and to seek protection under the British Raj.

Cultural legacy 

Arakanese chronicle records that more than six million shrines and pagodas flourished in Mrauk-U. A British archaeologist,  Emil Forchhammer noted that "in durability, architectural skill, and ornamentation the Mrauk-U temples far surpass those on the banks of Irrawaddy." Illustrative examples of Mrauk U period architecture include the Shite-thaung and Htukkanthein Temples.

Gold and silver coins serve as the heritage of the Mrauk-U period. The tradition of coin-making was handed down from the Vesali kings who started minting coins around the fifth century. The coins so far found are of one denomination only. Inscribed on the coins are the title of the ruling king and his year of coronation; coins before 1638 had Rakhine inscriptions on one side and Persian and Nagari inscriptions on the other. The inclusion of the foreign inscriptions was meant for the easy acceptance by the neighbouring countries and the Arab traders. Twenty-three types of silver coins and three types of gold coins have so far been found.

See also
 History of Chittagong
 History of Rakhine
 List of Arakanese monarchs
Arakanese monarchs' family tree
 History of Burma

Notes

Bibliography
 
 
 
 
 
 
 
 
 
 Encyclopædia Britannica. 1984 Edition. Vol. VII, p. 76

.01
Former countries in Burmese history
Former countries in Southeast Asia
Former kingdoms
Burmese monarchy
Former monarchies of Southeast Asia
History of Chittagong Division
15th century in Burma
16th century in Burma
17th century in Burma
18th century in Burma
2nd millennium in Bangladesh
States and territories established in 1429
States and territories disestablished in 1785
1429 establishments in Asia
1780s disestablishments in Asia
Bengal Sultanate
Former monarchies of Asia
Former protectorates